Alberto Manuel Andrade Carmona (December 24, 1943 – June 19, 2009) was a Peruvian lawyer and politician, born in Lima who served as the Mayor of Lima from 1996 to 2002 and as a Congressman from 2006 until his death.

Education 
He studied at the First National School of Peru of Our Lady of Guadalupe and at the Antonio Raimondi Italian School. He later studied law at the National University of San Marcos. He studied his postgraduate degree obtaining a Master's degree in Administration from ESAN. He created the ALDA leather products company. He married Ana Teresa Botteri Herrera, had four children and four grandchildren until his death.

Political career 
Andrade started his political career as a member of the Christian People's Party in 1983, resigning to found his own political party, Somos Lima in 1994, to run as an independent for the 1995 Municipal elections. A former mayor of Miraflores, he made many public works for this district and his brother Fernando Andrade also served as the district's mayor from 1996 to 1998 and from 2003 to 2006.

Mayor of Lima 
In the 1995 election, Andrade won the elections as mayor of Lima defeating Alberto Fujimori's ally, Jaime Yoshiyama and was sworn in on January 1, 1996. During his term as mayor, he was responsible for public works such as:
The Javier Prado Highway (turning the portion of Javier Prado Avenue between Paseo de la Republica and Circunvalacion Expressways, originally a boulevard, into its own expressway)
Modernizing parks and squares
Improving the city's taxicab system
The rebirth of the defunct Downtown Lima
In the 1998 municipal election, he was re-elected as mayor against Juan Carlos Hurtado Miller of the Vamos Vecino party, due to his high popularity, thanks to his first term high approval ratings.

2000 Presidential elections 
In 2000, he stood against President Alberto Fujimori in the presidential elections, but received in large part due to a smear campaign, manipulated by the government and only 3.0% of the vote finishing in third place, and continued as mayor.

2002 municipal elections 
In the 2002 municipal elections, he ran for a third term, promising to modernize transport, importing Colombian public buses, known as Transmilenio, but he was defeated by National Solidarity leader Luis Castañeda Lossio of the National Unity Alliance, placing second with 29.9% of the vote.

2006 elections and Congressman 
He ran unsuccessfully for the First Vice Presidency in the 2006 Peruvian general election as the running mate of former President Valentín Paniagua in the Frente de Centro's ticket, but was elected for a seat in Congress.

Death 
He died in Washington, D.C., United States on June 19, 2009 at the age of 65 from pulmonary fibrosis.

References

 

Mayors of Lima
National University of San Marcos alumni
People from Lima
1943 births
2009 deaths
Deaths from pulmonary fibrosis
We Are Peru politicians
Candidates for President of Peru
Members of the Congress of the Republic of Peru
Center Front politicians